In the Seattle King County area, there were estimated to be 11,751 homeless people living on the streets or in shelters. On January 24, 2020, the count of unsheltered homeless individuals was 5,578. The number of individuals without homes in Emergency Shelters was 4,085 and the number of homeless individuals in Transitional housing was 2,088, for a total count of 11,751 unsheltered people.

The percentages of individuals experiencing homelessness by race was: White 48%, African American 25%, Asian 2%, Native American 15%, Native Hawaiian or Pacific Islander 4%, Multi-racial 6%. In a survey conducted in 2019, 84% of homeless people in Seattle/King County lived in Seattle/King County prior to losing their housing, 11% lived in another county in Washington prior to losing their housing, and 5% lived out of state prior to losing their housing. Homelessness in Seattle is considered to be a crisis. It has been proposed that to address the crisis Seattle needs more permanent supportive housing.

A 2022 study found that differences in per capita homelessness rates across the country are not due to mental illness, drug addiction, or poverty, but to differences in the cost of housing, with West Coast cities like Seattle having homelessness rates five times that of areas with much lower housing costs like Arkansas, West Virginia, Detroit, and Chicago even though the latter locations have high burdens of opioid addiction and poverty.

History
The name "Skid Road" was in use in Seattle by the 1850s when the city's historic Pioneer Square neighborhood began to expand from its commercial core. The first homeless person in Seattle was a Massachusetts sailor named , who was found in a tent on the waterfront in 1854.

Measuring the growth of homelessness
Since 2017, the King County government with the help of many local organizations has organized the Point-In-Time Count of the number of people sleeping without adequate shelter in Seattle (~70%) and the rest of King County. From 1980 until 2016, the Seattle/King County Coalition on Homelessness(SKCCH) organized an Annual One Night Count of homeless people in ever expanding areas of Seattle and King County. Since 2006, counts have occurred on one night of the last ten days of January as specified by the US Department of Housing and Urban Development(HUD). Recent street counts have involved over 1000 volunteers counting people sleeping outside, in a tent, in an abandoned building or in a vehicle (see Unsheltered in the table below). Due to the pandemic, the 2021 street count was cancelled. The counts are not precisely comparable because of changes in the area covered, the time of year, the weather conditions during the count and other factors over the years. When the original reports are missing and surviving records are inconsistent, one count and both citations are recorded in the table. On the same day as the street count, emergency and transitional housing shelters are surveyed to determine how many homeless people are sheltering there. The homeless total includes the unsheltered street count plus those in emergency and transitional shelter (see Total in the table below). From 2006 to 2020, King County population growth averaged 1.7% per year while homelessness grew twice as fast at 3.5% per year and unsheltered homelessness exploded nearly eight times as fast at 13.4% per year.

The Total and Unsheltered Homeless counts since 2006 when HUD compliant January counts began:

Problems faced by homeless people

Medical problems
Many homeless people have health problems. Diabetes is a common ailment. Many homeless people do not seek or cannot afford adequate healthcare. In 2003, 47% of homeless individuals had one chronic condition. Health conditions among homeless persons in the Seattle area have included a history of alcohol or substance abuse; more than half had a cardiovascular disease; and a quarter had a mental health issue. Common causes of death among homeless people in the Seattle area include exposure, intoxication, cardiovascular disease, and homicide. In 2003, the average age of death of a homeless person was 47. 697 homeless people died in King County between 2012 and 2017. Since the beginning of the Covid-19 pandemic, homeless people compared to the general population are twice as likely to be hospitalized, four times as likely to require critical care, and two to three times as likely to die.

Harassment
In December 2007, the Seattle City Council unanimously passed a measure prohibiting malicious harassment of a homeless person and declaring the act a misdemeanor. This law makes it illegal to damage a homeless person's personal items as well.

Responses
As of 2018, the estimated total cost of homelessness in the region was estimated at about one billion dollars per year, including medical, police, and all nonprofit and governmental efforts at all levels.  This number is unverified. The City of Seattle 2020 Budget directly allocated $80 million for the Division of Homeless Strategy and Investment

The City of Seattle, King County, and the United Way of King County are the participants in the Seattle and King County Coalition on Homelessness. In April 2021, the voter initiative Charter Amendment Measure 29, known as Compassion Seattle proposed to amend the Seattle charter adding a clause which requires the municipal administration to allocate at least 12% of its general financial budget to human services. They are combining and coordinating efforts to respond to and end homelessness, while spending carefully. From 2010 to 2020 the King County added 67,000 units to the 112,000 lost due to the growth of rental canons which overcome the 80 percent of area median income (about $23,000 per year for a family of four in 2017). A coordinated effort is a response to previous findings from the Committee to End Homelessness in King County and the Ten year plan to End Homelessness, where committed organizations, including the United Way of King County, local businesses, faith based communities, housing organizations and human services organizations, studied the causes and solutions to homelessness.

Share/Wheel is self-help organization run by many homeless residents of Seattle. Share/Wheel has created 4 Tent Cities through the years. The first Tent City set up in 1990 at the Goodwill Games. It later became a self-managed homeless shelter at a Metro bus barn. It eventually moved to the Aloha Inn and created a self-managed transitional housing program. Tent City 2 was established on Beacon Hill in what would later become known as The Jungle, against the objections of the City of Seattle. Eviction notices were posted on the tents on July 2. Four days later on July 6, while most of the residents met with City Council member Peter Steinbrueck (who was attempting to delay action against the settlement), the Police bulldozed the camp site and private possessions.

Tent City 3 was created on March 31, 2000, on private land. The police did not intervene, but the City of Seattle sued the host over unpaid permit fees. Share/Wheel and the City of Seattle settled out of court with a consent decree after a Superior Court judge warned the City that it would lose the case. Tent City 3 moves from location to location every 60–90 days. Tent City 4 split from Tent City 3 and shifts from place to place on the East side of Lake Washington. Tent cities shelter homeless persons who can not or do not wish to attend a public shelter for various reasons. The City of Seattle does not approve of these tent cities. Effective March 13, 2012, the Consent Decree between Share/Wheel and the City of Seattle ended. Tent City 3 has been studied extensively, and is noted by many in the United States to be an encampment that works.

There are other encampments in the Seattle area:
Nickelsville: formed in 2008 in protest over the policies of Mayor Nickels, who they believed was encouraging the police to assault, injure, and browbeat the homeless. It has no formal connection to Share/Wheel.
 United We Stand: capacity 35 people, which split from Tent City 3 in late 2014.
 Camp Unity Eastside: capacity 100 people, on the east side of Lake Washington in King County, which split from Tent City 4 in late 2012.

There are homeless shelters across the Seattle area that provide beds, meals, showers, and laundry services. Some shelters in the Seattle area require their residents to leave the shelter between 5 and 7 A.M.

In addition to sanctioned homeless encampments, Seattle philanthropists have also become involved with serving the disenfranchised. The Seattle Block Project builds tiny homes in volunteers' backyards to house a single vetted individual. The goal of the project is to give a person a second chance. The project offers the opportunity for stability and safety, while asking the community to be involved in both donating space and labor. Through housing an individual and asking others to participate in the project the return is twofold, a person gets a safe place to live, and a community comes together to help the homeless. The Aurora Commons is a private effort to provide services to the homeless on Aurora Avenue North.
As of January 2020, more than 5,578 homeless people were living in the King County. In 2020 there were recorded 140 nominative deaths among them.

In June 2021, the Seattle City Council approved a plan to use $49 million of the $128 million from federal COVID-19 relief funds to support the city's homeless population. The plan put money towards direct cash assistance and aid programs, housing resources, enhanced shelter and outreach services and small business recovery.

Causes 

The root causes of homelessness are complex and multifaceted. According to a report issued by the mayor's office, these causes include issues with mental health and addiction, economic disparities and poverty, lack of affordable housing, racial disparities, the criminal justice system, the decentralized response to a regional crisis, and lack of wrap around services for youth within and exiting the foster system.

Some reasons for homelessness have been attributed to the cost of living in Seattle having significantly risen in the past decade due to gentrification, lack of publicly owned affordable housing, and the economic impact of the Covid-19 pandemic. These have all culminated in an increase in the homeless population. Another contributing factor to the rising price of housing has been Amazon establishing its headquarters in downtown Seattle and the subsequent influx of high-wage tech workers due to the tech boom, between 2010 and 2017 the median rental cost in Seattle rose 41.7%, while the national average was only a 17.6% increase.

Insufficient housing 
In a new book titled “Homelessness is a Housing Problem,” Clayton Page Aldern (a policy analyst and data scientist in Seattle) and Gregg Colburn (an assistant professor of real estate at the University of Washington’s College of Built Environments) studied per capita homelessness rates across the country along with what possible factors might be influencing the rates and found that high rates of homelessness are caused by shortages of affordable housing, not by mental illness, drug addiction, or poverty.

They found that mental illness, drug addiction and poverty occur nationwide, but not all places have equally expensive housing costs. One example cited is that two states with high rates of opioid addiction, Arkansas and West Virginia, both have low per capita rates of homelessness, because of low housing prices.  With respect to poverty, the city of Detroit is one of the poorest cities, yet Detroit's per capita homelessness rate is 20% that of West Coast cities like Seattle, Portland, San Francisco, Los Angeles, and San Diego. 
 

In an interview, Colburn stated: "To someone who says, “Will housing fix all of this? Or will there still be people on the street?,” we say that Seattle has five times the homelessness of Chicago. But there’s still homelessness, and there are people panhandling in Chicago. And so we aren’t suggesting that accommodating housing markets will end all homelessness. What we’re saying is, it doesn’t need to be five times what Chicago is."

Operation Sack Lunch

Operation Sack Lunch is a city-funded outdoor feeding program begun in 2007, located under the Interstate 5 viaduct at Cherry Street in downtown Seattle. In 2012, Seattle Human Services Director Danette Smith said that because of poor conditions under the freeway, it should close or move indoors. The program's operators said it could not continue at all if forced to move indoors, and no indoor location was found during three years of discussion over the fate of the program, with some Seattle city council members resisting efforts to move it indoors. In fall of 2012, a transition program was recommended by a Mayor-appointed Task Force.

Income sources
Real Change news is a newspaper sold by homeless street vendors; they buy the paper for 60 cents and sell it for 2 dollars. The Real Change has increased in sales by 41% since 2007. An increase in vendors was also recorded, growing from approximately 230 to 350 vendors in one month.

In 2009, income resources used by homeless persons included:  558 homeless persons who received Temporary Assistance for Needy Families (TANF), 481 receive Supplemental Security Income (SSI), 355 received general assistance (GAU), 233 had other sources of income, 142 were on general assistance (GAX), 49 received unemployment compensation, 21 received income through the Alcohol and Drug Addiction Treatment Act (ADATSA), and 590 homeless persons had an unknown source of income.

Seattle is Dying documentary
In 2019 KOMO-TV aired the hour-long documentary Seattle Is Dying written and reported by Eric Johnson, exploring homelessness in Seattle. Johnson said local authorities did not provide effective responses to the problems as he identified them, and said some law enforcement officials were not helping to address what the Johnson said were ongoing issues. Several Seattle media outlets and homelessness advocates criticized KOMO and Johnson for what they said was an inaccurate and biased picture of the issues, and that the contents of the documentary were motivated by the right-wing agenda of the nationwide Sinclair Broadcast Group, which has little interest in local Seattle politics but benefits from spreading a negative image of the liberal, west-coast city. Tim Harris of Real Change called it "misery porn".

The documentary states there is a homelessness crisis in Seattle and claims the causes include a lack of an urban social policy and the rampant drug use. Johnson advocated for a set of solutions, and said that local officials failed to engage with what he said were documented problems.

KOMO TV said their documentary was effective in influencing Seattle officials. Another of Sinclair's properties, KRCR-TV, said officials in Shasta County, California, have also responded to the documentary, and that they are taking measures to combat similar issues they face in their region.

Some advocates for the homeless have argued that the documentary focuses too heavily on issues such as drug use, countering that the high cost of living and lack of affordable housing are at the core of homelessness.

Pete Holmes, the Seattle City Attorney, criticized the documentary, defending the city's efforts on drug crimes and homelessness.

References

External links
2018 Point in Time Count, by the Numbers Infographic 
7 Big Takeaways from This Year's Homeless Count
 Seattle Homeless Needs Assessment 2009
 The Downtown Emergency Service Center
 SKCCH 2009 One Night Count Summary Information
 SKCCH One Night Count Summary Archive, 2003-2008
 Seattle Housing and Resource Effort / Women's Housing Equality and Enhancement League
 Leaves of Remembrance: The Homeless Remembrance Project

Culture of Seattle
Homelessness in the United States
Housing in Washington (state)